Allocyclosa is a genus of orb weaver spiders that contains only one species, Allocyclosa bifurca. It was first described in 1887 by McCook under the name Cyrtophora bifurca, and was transferred to its own genus in 1999. It is the only Cyclosa species north of Mexico to have a forked tail, hence the name bifurca, Latin for "two-forked". The forked abdomen, bearing two humps shaped like the letter M, is a defining feature in both males and females, though it is similar to features present in certain Cyrtophora species. Both sexes are a transparent green color, though only females have an area of red on their underside between the epigynum and the spinnerets. Females are nearly thirty percent larger than males, ranging from five to nine millimeters, while males range from two to three millimeters. Males are very uncommon. In a 1977 study by Levi, only two of the nearly 350 specimens that were positively identified as Cyrtophora bifurca were males. This is a very odd distribution, and it has been posed that females of the species, which have less prominent genitalia relative to other members of the orb-weaver family, may be parthenogenic, or able to reproduce without the help of males. Like other members of Araneidae, these spiders create orb webs, six to eight inches in diameter, but apply a unique form of protective mimicry. Females sit in the middle of a vertical row of web decoration, with egg sacs above and wrapped prey below. Because they all have a similar color and shape, it is difficult to discern between the egg sacs, the wrapped prey, and the spider itself.

References

Araneidae
Monotypic Araneomorphae genera
Spiders of North America